This is a list of the Dutch Top 40 number-one singles of 2009. The Dutch Top 40 is a chart that ranks the best-performing singles of the Netherlands. Published by radio station Radio 538.

Chart history

Number-one artists

See also
2009 in music
List of number-one hits (Netherlands)

References

Number-one singles
Netherlands
2009